Manon Melis is a retired Dutch professional footballer who played as a forward for the Netherlands women's national team from 2004 to 2016. During her international career she scored 59 goals from 136 games. From 2010 to 2019 she was the all-time top goalscorer for her country.

Melis scored on her debut for the senior national team on 25 April 2004, in an away game against Belgium, aged 17. Not until her 16th cap did she score again. An even longer goal drought followed, playing 17 matches in which she was unable to score her third. She helped the Dutch qualify for their first major finals by scoring in six of the eight matches in UEFA Women's Euro 2009 qualifying. At the finals held in Finland Melis played five matches, in which she scored once, against Denmark. On 21 August 2010 Melis became the all-time top goalscorer for the Netherlands after scoring twice against Belarus, her 29th and 30th international goals. She overtook Marjoke de Bakker's goal tally of 29, achieved between 1979 and 1991. At the 2013 Euros she played three matches but did not score and the Netherlands were eliminated at the group stage.

Melis earned her last cap on 9 March 2016 in a home game against Sweden, a qualification game for the 2016 Olympics. She scored her last goal, her 59th, in the penultimate match of her career, against Norway. Hers was the only Dutch goal in the 4–1 loss. Her highest number of goals in one match was four, scored in a 6–0 win over Serbia in 2011. In September 2013, she scored a hat-trick against Albania during 2015 FIFA Women's World Cup qualification. Serbia and Switzerland are the teams against which she has scored the most, six goals total, from two and six games respectively. Four of her 59 goals came from penalties; 25 were scored on home soil. Her most productive year was 2011 with 10 goals from 12 games. For nearly nine years Melis held the all-time goalscoring record, until 15 June 2019, when Vivianne Miedema surpassed Melis by scoring her 60th goal in a 3–1 win over Cameroon at a group stage match at the FIFA World Cup Finals in France. As of December 2020 Melis ranked second on the all-time goalscoring list for the Netherlands women's football team.

International goals
"Score" represents the score in the match after Melis's goal. "Score" and "Result" list the Netherlands' goal tally first. Cap represents the player's appearance in an international level match at senior level.

Statistics

See also

References

Melis
Melis goals
Melis goals
Melis